Urocortin-2 is a protein that in humans is encoded by the UCN2 gene.

This gene is a member of the sauvagine/corticotropin-releasing factor/urotensin I family. It is structurally related to the corticotropin-releasing factor (CRF) gene and the encoded product is an endogenous ligand for CRF type 2 receptors. In the brain it may be responsible for the effects of stress on appetite. In spite of the gene family name similarity, the product of this gene has no sequence similarity to urotensin II.

References

Further reading